Britannia Youngstown is a residential neighbourhood in west Edmonton, Alberta, Canada.  Originally part of the Town of Jasper Place, it became part of Edmonton when Jasper Place amalgamated with Edmonton in 1964.

The neighbourhood is bounded on the west by Mayfield Road, on the north by 107 Avenue, on the east by 156 Street, and on the south by Stony Plain Road.

The community is represented by the Britannia Youngstown Community League, established in 1959, which maintains a community hall, basketball courts, outdoor rink and a tennis court located at 159 Street and 105 Avenue.

Demographics 

Residential development 
A high proportion, approximately six out of ten, residences are rented with only four out of ten being owner occupied.  Almost half (48%)of residences in the neighbourhood are apartments in low-rise buildings of five or fewer stories.  Another 40% are single-family dwellings, with almost all of the remainder being row houses (6%) and duplexes (5%).

People 
The average household size is 2.1 persons, with approximately seven out of ten households having one or two people.

Average household income in Britannia Youngstown is lower than the Edmonton average.

Schools and training facilities 
There are three schools in the neighbourhood.  Youngstown Elementary School and Britannia Junior High School are operated by the Edmonton Public School system, while Elves School is a special needs school run by the Elves Special Needs Society. Elves School operates out of a building that is the former St. Luke's High School of the Edmonton Catholic School System.

The Edmonton Fire Department also operates a training facility in a former public high school in the neighbourhood's east end.

Shopping and services 
The Mayfield Common shopping centre and the Westlawn Cemetery occupy the south edge (Stony Plain Road) of the neighbourhood.

Surrounding neighbourhoods 
The neighbourhood is surrounded by a mixture of residential neighbourhoods and light industrial subdivisions.

Residential neighbourhoods are Mayfield to the north, High Park to the north east, Canora to the east, West Jasper Place to the south east, and Glenwood to the south.

Industrial subdivisions are Youngstown Industrial to the west and north west, Stone Industrial to the west, and the commercial district of Place LaRue to the south west.

See also 
 Edmonton Federation of Community Leagues

References

External links 
 Britannia Youngstown Neighbourhood Profile

Neighbourhoods in Edmonton